Morristown Regional Airport  (formerly called Moore–Murrell Airport) is a city-owned public-use airport located four nautical miles (7 km) southwest of the central business district of Morristown, a city in Hamblen County, Tennessee, United States. It was opened in 1953. The manager of the airport was Evelyn Bryan Johnson until her death on May 10, 2012.

This airport is included in the FAA's National Plan of Integrated Airport Systems for 2009–2013, which categorized it as a general aviation facility.

History

An office structure was constructed in 1953 along with a grass strip and maintenance hangar. In 1958, the first paved runway was completed. In 1968, the first professional terminal was dedicated. The original airport terminal was demolished on April 28, 2009. A new, more modern terminal opened in 2010 and was named Eyelyn Bryan Johnson Terminal for its longtime manager, Evelyn Bryan Johnson.

Southern Airways served the airport in the early 1960s with flights to/from Knoxville and Tri-City airports.

Facilities and aircraft 

It has one runway designated 5/23 with an asphalt surface measuring 5,717 by 100 feet (1,743 x 30 m).

For the 12-month period ending October 22, 2009, the airport had 46,000 aircraft operations, an average of 126 per day: 95% general aviation, 4% air taxi, and 1% military. At that time there were 40 aircraft based at this airport: 67.5% single-engine, 25% multi-engine, 5% jet and 2.5% helicopter.

For the 12-month period ending May 25, 2018, the airport had 49,500 aircraft operations, an average of 136 per day: 97% general aviation, 2% air taxi, and 1% military. At that time there were 33 aircraft based at this airport: 60.6% single-engine, 21.2% multi-engine, 12.1% jet, 3% helicopter, and 3% ultralight.

Also on site is Tennessee College of Applied Technology's Aviation Maintenance campus, occupying the terminal building and adjacent hangar.

References

External links 
 Moore–Murrell Airport (MOR) at Tennessee DOT Airport Directory
 Aerial image as of 7 March 1997 from USGS The National Map
 
 

Airports in Tennessee
Buildings and structures in Hamblen County, Tennessee
Morristown, Tennessee
Airports established in 1953
1953 establishments in Tennessee
Transportation in Hamblen County, Tennessee